State Route 216 (SR 216) is a state highway in the U.S. state of California. It is a loop of State Route 198 in Tulare County, running from Visalia to Ivanhoe and Woodlake.

Route description
The route begins at State Route 198 in Visalia with an interchange. It then continues to Ivanhoe, where it meets County Route J34. As it continues through Tulare County, it enters Woodlake, where it meets State Route 245. It then meets County Route J21 before meeting its north end at State Route 198.

The portion of SR 216 in the Visalia city limits is part of the National Highway System, a network of highways that are considered essential to the country's economy, defense, and mobility by the Federal Highway Administration.

Major intersections

See also

References

External links

California @ AARoads.com - State Route 216
Caltrans: Route 216 highway conditions
California Highways: SR 216

216
State Route 216
Streets in Visalia, California